A large tornado outbreak struck the Southern region of the United States on March 21–22, 2022, before transitioning to the Eastern United States on March 23. The outbreak started with numerous supercell thunderstorms and severe squall lines developing in central Texas and southern Oklahoma, prompting the issuance of numerous tornado warnings, including multiple PDS tornado warnings. An EF3 tornado caused considerable damage in Jacksboro, Texas while an EF2 tornado from the same storm caused a fatality in Sherwood Shores. Other strong tornadoes caused damage near College Station and in the Austin and Houston metropolitan areas. Severe and tornadic activity continued into the next day as the system moved eastward with numerous tornadoes reported in Mississippi and Alabama. On the evening of March 22, a supercell moved through the New Orleans metropolitan area, with an EF3 tornado producing severe damage in Arabi, resulting in one death and at least two injuries. Widespread flooding also accompanied the decaying squall line in Alabama. Tornadoes occurred on March 23 over the Eastern United States, associated with the same system, including EF2 tornadoes near Pickens, South Carolina, and Gladesboro, Virginia. In all, 85 tornadoes were confirmed.

Meteorological synopsis

March 21

Signs for a severe weather outbreak became evident multiple days before it came to fruition. On March 19, 2022, the Storm Prediction Center (SPC) issued a Day 3 enhanced risk for the areas encompassing central and eastern Texas and western Louisiana, as readings indicated that atmospheric conditions would become supportive for a damaging severe weather outbreak. The next day, the highlighted area was slightly shifted to the west, covering central Texas, and a 10%, hatched risk for strong tornadoes was introduced, as discrete supercell thunderstorms were expected to develop in the area. On the day of the event, the SPC upped the risk to a moderate risk, encompassing east-central Texas, as atmospheric conditions continued to become more favourable for severe weather. CAPE values reaching 1500-2000 J/kg placed themselves over a highly moist area, with 70 °F dew points present across south-central Texas. Additionally, a strong mid-upper-level jet of around  overspread the area, further increasing the instability in the atmosphere. As such, the SPC increased the size of the 10% hatched risk area for tornadoes, and introduced a small 15%, hatched corridor for strong tornadoes to occur, along east-central Texas.

As the evening progressed, and the atmospheric conditions for a major event to take place kept improving, the SPC issued its first tornado watch, spreading from extreme southern Oklahoma, all the way to the San Antonio area, discussing the elevated probabilities  for supercells and tornadoes to occur. Multiple supercells soon formed inside and outside the concern area. A powerful supercell developed just outside the main risk area, producing a strong, long-tracked EF3 tornado, that caused considerable damage in the town of Jacksboro, Texas. An EF2 tornado in Sherwood Shores, Texas caused major damage, killed one person and injured several others. The same storm also produced an EF1 tornado that caused significant damage in Kingston, Oklahoma.

As the evening rolled in, a squadron of powerful tornadic cells formed in the southern and central portions of the watch area. These cells soon became discrete in nature, and their isolation allowed for them to increase in intensity and coverage. Soon, multiple Particularly Dangerous Situation tornado warnings were issued from these supercells, as large and intense tornadoes were reported near Austin, Jarrell, and Elgin, Texas. A tornado hit a tower camera belonging to Austin ABC affiliate KVUE as it hit the Kalahari Resorts water park in Round Rock, Texas. A long-track supercell spawned several tornadoes, including multiple strong EF2 tornadoes, in College Station, Madisonville, Crockett, Alto, Mount Enterprise and Carthage, causing multiple injuries and damaging structures. The EF2 tornado that caused major damage in the Crockett area resulted in a fatality.

March 22

As the remnants of the storm system moved into Louisiana, it became the base for yet another day of intense tornadic activity. Moderate instability, were CAPE values of around 1500-2000 J/kg were present over central Louisiana and western Mississippi, interacted with 400m2/s2 helicity values and strong wind shear, creating a highly favorable environment for severe weather to develop. At dawn on March 22, the Storm Prediction Center issued a moderate risk encompassing central Louisiana and western Mississippi, and a large 15% hatched probability for tornadoes was introduced, as multiple sustained supercells were expected to develop in the area. In anticipation to the formation of a long squall line with embedded supercell structures in northern Louisiana and western Mississippi, the SPC issued a tornado watch for the area, discussing the moderate probabilities for intense tornadoes to form. It was the first of multiple watches to be issued that day.

As the line of storms progressed, multiple tornadoes were spawned from imbedded circulations within the line, some of which were strong. However, as the evening advanced, a long line of defined supercells developed on central Mississippi, soon becoming tornadic. Multiple tornadoes were reported from this line, including several strong EF2 tornadoes and an EF3 tornado. In Louisiana, a line of intense supercells formed in the late evening hours, and would go on to spawn the most notable tornadoes of the day. An intense high-end EF3 tornado caused considerable damage in the eastern New Orleans neighborhoods, as it was widely captured on video from multiple angles. The most severe damage was in Arabi, where several homes were destroyed. One person was killed and several other were injured. Multiple PDS tornado warnings were issued by the adjacent supercells, as additional tornadoes were spawned by the storms in central Louisiana.

March 23
Multiple areas were outlined by the Storm Prediction Center for March 23. The area first outlined was a 15% contour from the Florida Panhandle northeastward into Central Alabama and Central Georgia in a Day 7 outlook issued on March 17. Other than an extension into
Central South Carolina, this area did not significantly change until March 20, when the Day 4 outlook for this day significantly expanded to southeastern Virginia southwestward in northern Florida and Alabama was mostly eliminated. Virginia would eventually be removed from this area, but a slight risk covered the rest of the area in the Day 3 and Day 2 outlooks. Additionally, a marginal risk extended into the Great Lakes region and the 17:30 UTC Day 2 outlook added a slight risk to the Ohio Valley. These areas were refined on March 23, and all hazards were expected.

The line of storms that had moved through the Gulf Coast the previous night produced isolated wind damage and a weak tornado in the Florida Panhandle and Georgia. Farther north in the Ohio Valley, multiple severe thunderstorms, including supercells, formed at moved northeastward, producing scattered wind damage and hail. Three weak tornadoes also touched down in Ohio. The most significant area of tornadoes occurred when a small cluster of supercells formed of the higher terrain in the Western Carolinas that evening. Wind damage and tornadoes, two of which were rated EF2, touched down in this area, as well as southwestern Virginia. The storms weakened below severe limits that night. An isolated severe threat was expected the next day across most of the southeastern coast, but no reports came in, as the storm system exited completely into the Atlantic.

Confirmed tornadoes

March 21 event

March 22 event

March 23 event

Gretna–Arabi–New Orleans East, Louisiana

On March 22, a strong tornado touched down and moved through the New Orleans metropolitan area, originating in Gretna in Jefferson Parish at 7:21 p.m. CDT (00:21 UTC). The tornado began near Manhattan Boulevard and damaged some traffic lights. As it crossed Hero Drive and Claire Avenue, homes sustained minor roof damage and broken windows. A parked van was moved slightly, while fencing and tree limbs were downed. Minor damage continued as it moved through Gretna Park and across Mason Street and Creagan Avenue, where patio furniture and trees were damaged, and homes sustained minor damage to roofs, garages, and carports. The tornado then moved through parts of Terrytown, where homes and businesses had roofing material blown off. Additional damage occurred as the tornado crossed into the Algiers area of Orleans Parish. It moved across General Meyer Avenue and Patterson Drive in Algiers before it was caught on video crossing the Mississippi River. Damage in Algiers consisted of downed trees and tree branches, along with roof and siding damage to structures. All damage in the West Bank area (Gretna, Terrytown, Algiers) was consistent with an EF0 rating. After crossing the river, the tornado intensified to EF2 strength as it moved into St. Bernard Parish and the community of Arabi, just east of the Lower Ninth Ward of New Orleans. The tornado was broadcast live on television by skycam on WDSU as it was passing through the area, exhibiting horizontal vortices and accompanied by power flashes. Moving almost due-north through the middle of Arabi, the tornado caused a relatively narrow path of severe damage along the Friscoville Avenue corridor. Many homes in this area were badly damaged and sustained total loss of their roofs, detached garages were destroyed, power lines were downed, and trees were snapped. The exterior wall of an automotive repair business was blown outward, and a metal warehouse building that housed a brewery was destroyed. High-end EF2 damage occurred near the intersection of Friscoville Avenue and St. Bernard Highway (LA 46), where the La Vid Verdedera church was destroyed, cars were flipped, a strip mall was partially destroyed, and a small house was pushed off its foundation and largely collapsed. EF2 damage continued in neighborhoods north of St. Bernard Highway, where more homes had their roofs torn off and many trees were snapped or uprooted. Arabi Elementary School sustained damage to its roof and fencing, and a school bus was overturned at that location.

Continuing to the north-northeast at high-end EF2 strength, it then crossed into residential areas north of Judge Perez Drive (LA 39). Homes in this area had roofs and exterior walls torn off, and some were shifted off of their foundations. The tornado intensified further as it crossed Patricia Street into the St. Claude Heights neighborhood in northern Arabi. Two other nearby homes were completely leveled and swept away, one of which was reduced to a bare foundation slab. However, due to construction quality, a rating above EF3 was not assigned. Numerous other houses in this area had total roof and exterior wall loss, with only interior rooms left intact. Homes that were farther away from the center of the damage path suffered considerable roof and siding damage, and many had their windows blown out. The tornado momentarily weakened back to EF2 strength within the vicinity of Sidney Street, and dozens of homes suffered partial to total roof loss along this segment of the path. At least one house had partial exterior wall loss, and another residence was shifted off of its foundation. A large RV was tossed and flipped over, and power poles were snapped as well. Just north of here, the tornado reached EF3 strength for a second time, and multiple houses had their roofs torn off and exterior walls collapsed. A couple of poorly-anchored homes built on raised pier foundations were swept completely away, and debris was scattered throughout the neighborhood. The lone fatality from the tornado occurred in this area when a pickup truck was thrown against a tree, killing the driver. Some metal truss electrical transmission towers were significantly damaged along the bank of the Florida Canal as the tornado exited Arabi. The tornado weakened substantially as it moved back into Orleans Parish across Bayou Bienvenue and the Gulf Intracoastal Waterway, again causing minor damage consistent with an EF0 rating. Minor damage continued as the tornado crossed Almonaster Avenue into New Orleans East. A metal building sustained damage to its exterior, and some metal shipping containers were rolled into wooden power poles, snapping them in half. Several fences, trees, and tree limbs were downed, and more homes sustained mainly minor roof, siding, and garage door damage in the area of Read Boulevard, Chef Menteur Highway (US 90), Prentiss Avenue, and Coronado Drive before the tornado dissipated at 7:38 p.m. CDT (00:38 UTC) near Dwyer Road at Joe W. Brown Memorial Park, south of I-10. In addition to the fatality, at least two people were injured. As a high-end EF3, this tornado was the strongest ever on record to hit the New Orleans metropolitan area.

An EF2 tornado would strike Gretna and Arabi just nine months later on December 14, 2022. Unlike this tornado, that tornado would cause significant damage in both communities. Six people were injured.

Non-tornadic effects
The storms produced  inches of rain to areas of Texas where many areas were facing drought conditions and about 170 wildfires, helping lessen the impact of the previous conditions. A flash flood warning was issued for northwestern Tuscaloosa County, Alabama at 7:21 p.m. CDT (00:21 UTC) on March 22, which was originally scheduled to expire at 9:15 p.m. CDT (02:15 UTC); however, it was extended until 10:15 p.m. CDT (03:15 UTC). These floods closed some roads near the campus of the University of Alabama, and overflowed Twomile Creek in Northport; no damage has been reported yet as a result of these floods. Flash flood warnings were issued throughout several other counties in Alabama as well, including Shelby, Jefferson, Walker, Greene, and Hale counties. This flash flooding submerged a car, killing three people.

Preparations and impacts

Due to the projected path of severe weather, many schools either closed early or cancelled after-school activities March 22 in Louisiana and Mississippi to allow for students to get to safety and shelters were opened for those without adequate protection.

Multiple Amtrak trains were severely delayed due to having to wait for severe weather to pass along their routes on March 21. At least 19 people were hospitalized due to injuries from the severe weather in Texas; about 10 were hospitalized in Grayson County and about 9 were treated in Jack County.

Aftermath
On March 22, Texas governor Greg Abbott issued a disaster declaration for 16 counties in the state. Over 48,000 households in Texas were reported to be without power the morning of March 22, and several schools in the Houston area opened late. In Jacksboro, Texas the high school and elementary school were reported to be damaged along with between 60 and 80 homes, with damage also seen in Round Rock, Granger, and Taylor, Texas. Louisiana governor John Bel Edwards issued a state of emergency for Jefferson, Orleans, St. Bernard, and St. Tammany parishes following the tornadoes. After the storm it was reported that about 8,000 customers were without power in New Orleans, and about 13,000 customers were without power in the three surrounding parishes.

See also

Weather of 2022
List of North American tornadoes and tornado outbreaks
Tornado outbreak of February 7, 2017

Notes

References

External links
 LIVE Severe Weather Updates with Chief Meteorologist James Spann
 LIVE Severe Weather Updates with Chief Meteorologist James Spann
 LIVE Severe Weather Updates with Chief Meteorologist James Spann
 LIVE Severe Weather Updates with Chief Meteorologist James Spann
 LIVE Severe Weather Updates with Chief Meteorologist James Spann

2022 meteorology
Tornadoes of 2022
Tornado outbreaks
2022 natural disasters in the United States
Tornadoes in Alabama
2022 in Alabama
Tornadoes in Louisiana
2022 in Louisiana
Tornadoes in Mississippi
2022 in Mississippi
Tornadoes in Ohio
2022 in Ohio
Tornadoes in Oklahoma
2022 in Oklahoma
Tornadoes in Texas
2022 in Texas
March 2022 events in the United States
Tornadoes in Georgia (U.S. state)
Tornadoes in North Carolina
Tornadoes in South Carolina
Tornadoes in Virginia
2022 in North Carolina
2022 in Virginia
2022 in South Carolina
2022 in Georgia (U.S. state)
F3 tornadoes